Pima flavidorsella is a species of snout moth. It lives in Mozambique.

References

Endemic fauna of Mozambique
Phycitini
Pima (moth)
Lepidoptera of Mozambique
Moths of Sub-Saharan Africa
Moths described in 1927